Kellian-Key Albertus Alexander van der Kaap (born 8 November 1998) is a Dutch professional footballer who plays as a centre back for Bulgarian First League club Levski Sofia.

Career
Born in Groningen, he joined SC Cambuur in the summer of 2019. He made his debut for the club on 13 September 2019 as a substitute in a 5–1 victory at home to Helmond Sport.

He signed for Maccabi Netanya for an undisclosed fee in September 2020. On 5 August 2021, van der Kaap joined Danish Superliga club Viborg FF on a deal until June 2024. He made only two appearances for the club, before signing with Bulgarian First League club Levski Sofia on 19 January 2022.

Honours
Levski Sofia
 Bulgarian Cup: 2021–22

References

External links
 
 

Living people
1998 births
Dutch people of Cameroonian descent
Footballers from Groningen (city)
Dutch footballers
Association football defenders
FC Groningen players
SC Cambuur players
Harkemase Boys players
Be Quick 1887 players
Maccabi Netanya F.C. players
Viborg FF players
PFC Levski Sofia players
Eerste Divisie players
Derde Divisie players
Israeli Premier League players
Danish Superliga players
Dutch expatriate footballers
Expatriate footballers in Israel
Expatriate men's footballers in Denmark
Expatriate footballers in Bulgaria
Dutch expatriate sportspeople in Israel
Dutch expatriate sportspeople in Denmark
Dutch expatriate sportspeople in Bulgaria